Jourdan may refer to:
Carolyn Jourdan, American author
Claude Jourdan (1803–1873), French zoologist and paleontologist
David W. Jourdan, businessman
Jean-Baptiste Jourdan (1762–1833), French army commander
Jourdan Bobbish (1994–2012), prominent American murder victim
Jourdan Dunn, British fashion model
Jourdan Lewis, American football player
Louis Jourdan (1921–2015), French actor
Phil Jourdan, writer
Pierre Jourdan (1932–2007), French actor and director
Jourdan Urbach, retired violinist

See also
 Jordan (disambiguation)